Cellulophaga is a Gram-negative, strictly aerobic and rod-shaped bacterial genus from the family of Flavobacteriaceae which occur in marine alga and beach mud. Cellulophaga species produce zeaxanthin.

References

Further reading 
 
 

Flavobacteria
Bacteria genera